Nicolaisen or Nikolaisen is a surname. The following individuals have the surname:

 Donald Nicolaisen, American politician
 Elvira Nikolaisen (born 1980), Norwegian singer/songwriter
 Emil Nikolaisen (born 1977), Norwegian musician and producer
 Kaia Wøien Nicolaisen (born in 1990), Norwegian biathlete
 Petra Nicolaisen (born 1965), German politician
 Rasmus Nicolaisen (born 1997), Danish footballer
 W. F. H. Nicolaisen (1927–2016) German folklorist, linguist, medievalist, and scholar

See also
Nicolaysen, surname